Zain Amat (born May 10, 1975) is a retired Singaporean trap shooter, formerly specializing in the Olympic Double Trap. He has represented Singapore since 2004 as part of the Singapore Clay Shooting Team.

At the 2005 Southeast Asian Games, Amat won an individual gold medal in Double Trap.

In the 2007 Southeast Asian Games, having switched to Olympic Trap from mid-2006, he won the individual and team Olympic Trap event; beating teammate Lee Wung Yew and Thailand's Atig Kitcharoen for the individual gold medal. Amat was also in the team that won the Olympic Double Trap team gold medal. Together with teammates Lee Wung Yew and Choo Choon Seng, Amat became a select group of SEA Games shooting athlete who have won both individual trap and double trap titles.

Amat won the Meritorious Award for Sports in 2006 and 2008.

As of March 2018, he has retired from the Singapore Shooting Team. 

Amat is a Malay Singaporean. He was educated at Raffles Institution and later Nanyang Junior College.

References

1975 births
Living people
Trap and double trap shooters
Singaporean male sport shooters
Shooters at the 2006 Asian Games
Shooters at the 2010 Asian Games
Shooters at the 2014 Asian Games
Southeast Asian Games gold medalists for Singapore
Southeast Asian Games medalists in shooting
Competitors at the 2005 Southeast Asian Games
Competitors at the 2007 Southeast Asian Games
Asian Games competitors for Singapore
21st-century Singaporean people